Kyei is a surname. It may refer to:

Surname
Baffour Kyei (born 1989), Ghanaian footballer
F. P. Kyei, Ghanaian police officer, Inspector General of Police
Grejohn Kyei (born 1995), French footballer
Jeffrey Kyei (born 1989), German footballer
Nana Kyei (born 1998), English footballer
Obi Kyei (born 1994), Australian-British basketball player

Middle name
Eyiah Kyei Baffour, Ghanaian politician and member of the Ghanaian Parliament
Osei Kyei Mensah Bonsu (born 1957), Ghanaian urban planner and politician.
Kwadwo Kyei Frimpong, Ghanaian politician and member of Parliament
Jaren Kyei Merrell, American drag queen known as Shea Couleé